Jean-Marie Sander (born December 23, 1949) is a French farmer, politician and banker. He serves as the Chairman of Crédit Agricole.

Early life
Sander was born on December 23, 1949 in Ohlungen, a small town in northeastern France.

Career
Sander inherited 17 hectares of farming land in Ohlungen. He turned it into 100 hectares. He later became the Mayor of Ohlungen.

He has served as the Chairman of Crédit Agricole, a French bank, since May 2010. He will step down in 2015.

References

Living people
1949 births
People from Bas-Rhin
Mayors of places in Grand Est
French bankers
Crédit Agricole